Howard Springs Nature Park is a   protected area located  south of Darwin, Northern Territory. A suitable habitat for waterfowl of the Northern Territory, it also has swimming areas and walking trails. 
The actual Springs became important in 1910 when they came under consideration as a solution to Darwin's unreliable water supply.

See also
Protected areas of the Northern Territory

References

External links
Official webpage
Webpage on the Tourism NT website 
Webpage on the Protected Park website

Nature parks of the Northern Territory